Nodosaurinae is a subfamily of nodosaurid ankylosaurs from the Cretaceous of Europe, North America, and South America. The group is defined as the largest clade containing Nodosaurus textilis but not Hylaeosaurus armatus, Mymoorapelta maysi, or Polacanthus foxii, and was formally named in 2021 by Madzia and colleagues, who utilized the name of Othenio Abel in 1919, who created the term to unite Ankylosaurus, Hierosaurus and Stegopelta. The name has been significantly refined in content since Abel first used it to unite all quadrupedal, plate-armoured ornithischians, now including a significant number of taxa from the Early Cretaceous through Maastrichtian of Europe, North America, and Argentina. Previous informal definitions of the group described the clade as all taxa closer to Panoplosaurus, or Panoplosaurus and Nodosaurus, than to the early ankylosaurs Sarcolestes, Hylaeosaurus, Mymoorapelta or Polacanthus, which was reflected in the specifiers chosen by Madzia et al. when formalizing the clade following the PhyloCode.  The 2018 phylogenetic analysis of Rivera-Sylva and colleagues was used as the primary reference for Panoplosaurini by Madzia et al., in addition to the supplemental analyses of Thompson et al. (2012), Arbour and Currie (2016), Arbour et al. (2016), and Brown et al. (2017).

References

Nodosaurids
Cretaceous dinosaurs